Guoyuan means orchard in Chinese, may refer to:
 orchard
 Guoyuan, Changsha, Hunan, China
 Guoyuan station, Beijing, China
 Guoyuan Subdistrict, Beijing, China
 , a township in Jiuquan, Gansu Province, China
 , a township in Tangshan, Hebei Province, China
 , a township in Linxia Hui Autonomous Prefecture, Gansu Province, China
 Pingguoyuan (disambiguation), various geo name. Itself means apple orchard.